The Larmenius Charter or Carta Transmissionis ("Charter of Transmission") is a coded Latin manuscript purportedly created by Johannes Marcus Larmenius (Fr.: Jean-Marc Larmenius) in February 1324, detailing the transfer of leadership of the Knights Templar to Larmenius after the death of Jacques de Molay.  It also has appended to it a list of 22 successive Grand Masters of the Knights Templar after de Molay, ending in 1804, the name of Bernard-Raymond Fabré-Palaprat appearing last on the list (who revealed the existence of the Charter in 1804). The document is written in a supposed devised ancient Knights Templar Codex. Actually in Freemason custody, the document is kept at the Mark Masons Hall in London. Some researchers have concluded that it is a forgery, while others assert its authenticity.

An English translation of the Larmenius Charter was published in 1830.

Contents 

In the document, Larmenius, then an aged man, implies that the Grand Mastership of the Knights Templar Order was transmitted to him ten years earlier (March, 1314) by the imprisoned Jacques de Molay, the last Grand Master of the Knights Templar.

Larmenius was a Palestinian-born Christian who became a member of The Order of the Temple during the waning years of the Crusades. He was later the Templar Preceptor on the island domain of Cyprus after the Templar exodus from the mainland of the Holy Land to Cyprus after the fall of Acre in 1295. In this position, Larmenius was left in charge as Templar Seneschal (second highest rank in the Order) of the large remaining "exited" Templar forces in the Mediterranean in 1305  when de Molay was tricked into coming to Paris for meetings with Philip IV of France  and the Pope Clement V.

In the document, Larmenius states he has become too aged to continue with the rigorous requirements of the Office of Grand Master, and transfers his Grand Mastership of the Templar Order to Franciscus Theobaldus, the Prior of the Templar Priory still remaining at Alexandria, Egypt. With this declarative Charter, Larmenius sought to protect the Order for perpetuity by continuing the legitimate line of Grand Masters of the Templar Order. The Charter traces the Order through a dark period until its semi-private unveiling at the Convent General of the Order at Versailles in 1705 by Philippe II, Duke of Orléans, elected Grand Master of the Templar Order, and later also Regent of France.

History 
The Charter has been suspected to be a forgery by some, particularly Masonic researchers, suggesting it was the work of a Jesuit named Father Bonani, who assisted Philippe II, Duke of Orléans in 1705 to fabricate the document, yet no evidence exists for this claim. Other researchers, such as John Yarker, Friedrich Münter, and Henri Grégoire, believed the Charter to be authentic.

A Papal Bull, Decree XXXVII, columns 763-4, vol. 25 of the "Concilium Avenionense", also known as the Decree of Avignon of 1326, may be a contemporary primary source document written in response to the circumstances outlined in the Charter, and thereby affirm the historicity of the Larmenius claims.

Another hoax theory is that an item of furniture was bought by Brother Ledru at auction after the death of the former Grand Master Louise-Hercule Timoleon, whereupon he discovered the Charter of Larmenius hidden inside it, and showed it to Fabré-Palaprat in 1804. However, this claim is disputed by Pierre Adet, French Ambassador to the United States and member of the Order of the Temple, who received the documents with the Regent Radix-de-Chevillon from the previous Grandmaster Louis-Hercule Timoleon personally, not from a piece of furniture. Peter Partner believes the document was fabricated by Ledru just prior to 1804, however, the signatures on the Charter have been verified back to at least 1681, nullifying the possibility of this theory.

The Code 
While the Charter actually is written in some code, a number of researchers have claimed that the codex, once deciphered, appears to be a more modern, scholarly Latin, and not ecclesiastical Latin used during the period of its supposed origin. However, this is due to the fact that the original translator, M. Thory, in his Acta Latomorum, cleaned up and standardized the text, which was later mistaken for a literal translation. The former owner of the Charter, Fred J.W. Crowe published a literal translation of the Charter in Transactions of the Quatuor Coronati Lodge, 1911, showing the Latin is consistent with the fourteenth century, and the marked difference from Thory's version. Crowe then submitted the Charter for examination to Sir George Warner, Keeper of the Manuscripts at the British Museum, who also determined the Latin to be of the fourteenth century, consistent with the claims of the Charter.

Legacy 
The Larmenius Charter is still used today by some in the Neo-Templar movement as a means to claim legitimacy back to the original Order. Notably, on October 2, 2021, Ronald S. Mangum, Grandmaster of Ordre Souverain et Militaire du Temple de Jérusalem (OSMTJ), ceremonially signed a copy of the Larmenius Charter at Castle Otttis in St. Augustine, Florida.

See also
 Bernard-Raymond Fabré-Palaprat
 Johannite Church
 Ordo Supremus Militaris Templi Hierosolymitani
 Self-styled orders

References

External links 
 Ordre Souverain et Militaire du Temple de Jérusalem (OSMTJ)

Further reading
  
 Extracted from Volume 1 of his book 
 

Knights Templar
Self-styled orders